WJMG (92.1 FM, "G 92.1") is a radio station licensed to serve the community of Hattiesburg, Mississippi, and serving the Laurel-Hattiesburg area. The station airs an urban contemporary format.

It, along with sister station WORV, are owned by Vernon C. Floyd of Hattiesburg.  A licensed broadcast engineer, he did much of the work himself in the construction of the two stations' facility located in North Hattiesburg.

External links

JMG
Urban contemporary radio stations in the United States